Timothy Davis-Reed is an American film, television and theater actor. 
He has a Bachelor of Fine Arts degree from Syracuse University and studied acting with Charles Nelson Reilly and Arthur Storch. As a television actor, he was in all 45 episodes of the half-hour comedy Sports Night, 56 episodes of the political drama The West Wing, and 2 episodes of Studio 60 on the Sunset Strip.

Davis-Reed currently serves as an instructor at Syracuse University; he teaches sections of freshman acting, stage combat, audition, scene study, and film classes.  He also shares his expertise on audition technique and film acting through workshops.

Timothy Davis-Reed appeared in an episode of Monk that aired on December 22, 2007.

As a film actor, Davis-Reed appeared in Material Girls, a comedy starring Hilary Duff and Haylie Duff. He also performed in the New York Shakespeare Festival with Angela Bassett.

External links

Resume

American male television actors
American male film actors
American male stage actors
Year of birth missing (living people)
Living people
Syracuse University alumni